Family Business is a 1986 French comedy film directed by Costa-Gavras.

Plot
A professional thief (Johnny Hallyday) just released from jail returns to stealing to support his family. After several successful thefts, he decides to bring his son into the family business.

Cast
 Johnny Hallyday as the father
 Fanny Ardant as the mother
 Guy Marchand as Maximilien Faucon
 Laurent Romor as François as a child
 Rémi Martin as François
 Juliette Rennes as Martine as a child
 Caroline Pochon as Martine
 Ann-Gisel Glass as Sophie
 Fabrice Luchini as the shady lawyer
 Françoise Bette as the sister-in-law
 François Levantal

References

External links

1986 films
1986 comedy films
French comedy films
1980s French-language films
Films directed by Costa Gavras
1980s French films